Coloconger canina is an eel in the family Colocongridae (worm eels/short-tail eels). It was described by Peter Henry John Castle and Solomon N. Raju in 1975. It is a marine, deep-water dwelling eel which is known from leptocephali collected from the Indian Ocean. It is known to dwell at a minimum depth of 300 m.

References

Eels
Taxa named by Peter Henry John Castle
Taxa named by Solomon N. Raju
Fish described in 1975